Powder puffs are pieces of soft material used for the application of face powder. They may be shaped as balls or pads.

Historically, powder puffs have been made of very fine down feathers, cotton, fine fleece, etc. In modern times synthetic materials are widely used for powder puffs.

In addition to softness, an important characteristic of powder puffs is their intake ability, i.e., the ability to hold powder.  It was reported that for synthetic fibers important factors in designing high-intake powder puffs are mostly geometric ones: fiber diameter, pile length, and space between fibers, with little dependence on material factors.

Powder puffs have been used as a stereotype image for soft, careless femininity, as seen, e.g., in the term "powderpuff sports", including collegiate sorority flag football leagues. The name of the Powerpuff Girls is a pun on "powder puff".
 
American inventor Ellene Alice Bailey (1853-1897) patented several versions of powder puffs and has been described as "America’s powder puff pioneer".

References 

Cosmetics